The Webster/Dudley Band of Chaubunagungamaug Nipmuck Indians, also known as the Chaubunagungamaug, Chaubunagungamaug Nipmuck, Pegan or Dudley Indians, are a Native American tribe indigenous to the U.S. states of Massachusetts and Connecticut in the region of New England. They are an unrecognized tribe, meaning they are not federally recognized as a Native American tribe. They are also not state-recognized, unlike the Nipmuc Nation.

Members trace their ancestry to Nipmuck which lived between Lake Chaubunagungamaug and the Maanexit River. Contact with English settlers began in the 1630s, as the colonists began following the Indian trails to new settlements in the Pioneer Valley or the Pequot War (1634-1638). By the 1670s, the Chaubunagungamaug Nipmuck came under the nominal control of the Massachusetts Bay Colony and under the expanding missionary influence of the Rev. John Eliot, leading to the establishment of a 'Praying Town of Chabanakongkomun' in 1674. After the ravages of King Philip's War (1675-1676), the Chaubunagungamaug Nipmuck were awarded a reservation in 1682. This reservation was sold in 1870, following the passage of the Massachusetts Indian Enfranchisement Act the year prior, forcing the tribe to disperse and assimilate into the surrounding communities.

The tribe incorporated in 1981. Private land in Webster, Massachusetts and Thompson, Connecticut is used by the tribe as its homebase.  Members worked closely with the Hassanamisco Nipmuc under Nipmuc Nation, especially in regards to federal recognition, but the tribe split from Nipmuc Nation in 1996. Many of the Chaubunagungamaug Nipmuck remain affiliated with Nipmuc Nation, where they are counted among the Hassanamisco Nipmuc. The tribe was denied federal recognition as an Indian tribe in 2001, 2004, and 2007 decisions from the Bureau of Indian Affairs.

Ethnonyms

The Chaubunagungamaug Nipmuck prefer the spelling Nipmuck as opposed to Nipmuc.  The term derives from nippamaug, "freshwater fishing pond." This has cognates in the closely related Massachusett language (with revived Wampanoag spelling in parentheses), such as the base nippa-/(nup-), 'freshwater,' and -âmaug/(-ômâk), 'fishing pond.'

Chaubunagungamaug, one of two official Indigenous names for Webster Lake which occupies much of the southern half of the town, signifies "divided fishing place" or "fishing place at the boundary," because the lake was once divided into exclusive fishing zones with the Nipmuck at the northern part of the lake living in a village also known as Chabunagungamag and a related Nipmuck group living at Monuhchogok (Manchaug) to the south of the lake. The lake's full name is Chargoggagoggmanchauggagoggchaubunagungamaugg and includes roots cognate to Massachusett /(), 'to divide,' and -âmaug/(-ômâk), 'fishing pond.'  Eliot used a variant, Chabonakongkomun, for the Praying town established near the site of the old village and its inhabitants.

Throughout most of the 18th century, the Nipmuck of Chaubunagungamaug were commonly referred to as the Pegan Indians (not to be confused with Piegan Blackfoot) because of the prevalent nature of the surname Pegan amongst its members, many of whom had ancestral ties to Natick. It is cognate to Massachusett /(pâhk-), 'clear.'

English settlers, and later other immigrant groups, generally referred to the Nipmuck near the lake by the name of the location of the reservation. As Praying Indians, they were originally known as the Praying Indians of Chabanakongkomun. The reservation lands granted by Massachusetts were included in the town of Dudley, Massachusetts, and moved to a section of town later ceded and incorporated as the town of Webster, Massachusetts. As a result, they were known as the Dudley, Webster-Dudley, Dudley-Webster and Webster Indians.

In 1996, the tribe adopted the formal name Webster/Dudley Band of the Chaubunagungamaug Nipmuck Indians.

Location
The Nipmuck homeland was referred to as Nippenet, 'freshwater (pond) place,' due to the large number of small ponds and lakes that dotted the region now covered by most of central Massachusetts and adjacent portions of north-eastern Connecticut and north-western Rhode Island. Within this region, the Chaubunagungamaug were concentrated in an area between Lake Chaubunagungamaug and the Maanexit River, corresponding to the towns of Dudley, Southbridge, Webster, Charlton, Oxford, Sutton, Douglas in southern Worcester County, Massachusetts and the town of Thompson in Windham County, Connecticut.

The principal village of Chaubunagungamaug was located north of the lake in what is now Webster. The reserve lands were dwindled away and later surrounded by the town of Dudley. The reservation lands were moved back to the area around the lake which was later split off and incorporated as the town of Webster, where a few acres remain in the tribe's use as the reservation.

Tribal membership
Membership in the tribe is open to lineal descendants of the "Dudley Indians" enumerated in the 1861 Report to the Governor and Council concerning the Indians of the Commonwealth (Earle Report) conducted by Indian Commissioner John Milton Earle or the 1890 Worcester Probate Court lists of beneficiaries to the funds from the reservation land sales. Surnames of Dudley Indians on the Earle Report of 1861 include Bakeman, Beaumont, Belden, Cady, Corbin, Daley, Dorus, Esau, Fiske, Freeman, Henry, Hull, Humphrey, Jaha, Kyle, Nichols, Oliver, Pegan, Robinson, Shelley, Sprague, White, Willard and Williard. In 2004, the tribe had 354 members.

In 2004, 277, or 53 percent, of the Nipmuck identifying with the Nipmuc Nation and listed in the Hassanamisco Nipmuc tribal rolls at the time were Chaubunagungamaug Nipmuck that remained after the 1996 exit of the Webster/Dudley Band, mostly from the Jaha, Humphrey, Belden, Pegan/Wilson, Pegan and Sprague families listed on the Earle Report. This also indicated that at that time, 43 percent of the total known population of descendants of the Dudley Indians, to which the Webster/Dudley Band are a successor, were not included in tribal rolls.

Government
Since 1981, when Sachem ('Chief') Edwin "Wise Owl" Morse, Sr., incorporated as the Chaubunagungamaug Nipmuck, leadership of the tribe has passed through his descendants, currently headed by Sachem Edwin Morse III.  Since 1996, the tribe has its own elected council.  The council is elected to serve three-year terms, with elections occurring at the end of December.  As of November 2013, the council consists of Chairman/Treasurer Kenneth White, Vice-Chairman David White, Secretary Sherry Davis, Enrollment Committee Chairperson Stacey Kelleher, Resident Agent Tom Morse, Claudia Zatorski, Barbi Gardiner and Melissa Greene.  Councillors are restricted to certain family lines, such as the Dorus/White, Sprague/Henries and Nichols/Heath branches.

Sachems since 1981
 Sachem Edwin Wise Owl Morse, Sr., 1981-2010.
 Sacehm Edwin Red Fox Morse, Jr., 2010 - 2013.
 Sachem Edwin Spring Fox Morse III, 2013–present.

Relationship with other Nipmuc 
Although tribal relations between the Webster/Dudley Band of the Chaubunagungamaug Nipmuck and the Hassanamisco Nipmuc (including Nipmuc Nation Chaubunagungamaug Nipmuc) were formerly strained, the close kinship ties and shared cultural pursuits have helped to heal old wounds. The two tribes are currently working together to revive the Nipmuck language, get Nipmuck involved in archaeological projects such as Project Mishoon and make use of land identified by the East Quabbin Land trust as a possible site for a Nipmuck cultural centre.  Other Nipmuck groups, without state recognition, include the Connecticut Nipmuc, descendants of Nipmuck from the Praying towns that were located in what is now Connecticut and Nipmuck that relocated there, as well as the Quinsigamond Nipmuc, including many Nipmuck that either descend from the original Quinsigamond Nipmuc or later migrants into the areas around Worcester, Massachusetts. Nippamaug of all bands regularly attend the powwows, Indian fairs and social gatherings of the others.  The Chaubunagungamaug Nipmuck, Hassanamisco Nipmuc and Natick Massachusett, as state recognized tribes in Massachusetts, work with the Massachusetts Commission on Indian Affairs to provide support for Native peoples.

Notable Chaubunagungamaug Nipmuck

Chiefs and Leaders
 Sachem Willymachin 'Black James,' 17th century Chief.
 Sachem James, son and heir of Willymachin and brother to Simon, 17th century Chief.
 Sachem Simon, son and heir of Willymachin and brother to James, 17th century Chief.
 Joseph, Teacher of the Praying Town of Chabanakongkomun, son of Hassanamisco Nipmuc Sachem Robin Petahvit, 17th century.
 Sachem Edwin Wise Owl Morse, Sr., Chief from 1981 to 2010.
 Sachem Edwin Red Fox Morse, Jr., Chief from 2010 to 2013.
 Sachem Edwin Spring Fox Morse III, incumbent Chief.
 David Tall Pine White, Tribal councillor, language instructor, language consultant/actor on We Shall Remain mini-series.

Veterans
 Joshua Ephraim, American Revolutionary War Veteran, 18th century.
 Eleazer Pegan, American Revolutionary War Veteran, 18th century.
 Josiah Pegan, American Revolutionary War Veteran, 18th century.
 Joseph Pegan, American Revolutionary War Veteran, Jr., 18th century.
 Josiah Pegun, American Revolutionary War Veteran, 18th century.
 Hezekiah Dorus, Civil War Veteran, 19th century.
 Joseph E. Bowman, Civil War Veteran, 19th century.
 William H. Cady, Civil War Veteran, 19th century.
 Joseph H. P. White, Civil War Veteran, 19th century.
 James M. Pegan, Civil War Veteran, 19th century.
 Theophilus D. Freeman, Civil War Veteran, 19th century.
 Israel Henries, World War I Veteran, 20th century.
 Earl Edward Henries, World War II draftee, 20th century.

'Last of the Nipmucks'
The following gained notoriety as the so-called 'last of the' or 'last full-blooded' Nipmuck:
 Angela Lynch, née Sprague, d. 1914.
 Matilda Maria Henries (Matilda Henry), née Nichols, d. 1920.
 Henry E. Dorus, d. sometime after 1936.
 Payne Henries, d. sometime after 1930.

See also 
 Nipmuc people
 Nipmuc Nation
 Native American tribes in Massachusetts

References

External links
 Chaubunagungamaug Nipmuck Indian Council website .
 Nipmuc History.
 Nipmuc Language. Featuring David Tall Pine White as language instructor/actor in PBS' We Shall Remain.
 Nipmuc Association of Connecticut.
 Nipmuc Basketry.

Native American tribes in Massachusetts
Nipmuc
Webster, Massachusetts
Dudley, Massachusetts
Thompson, Connecticut
Unrecognized tribes in the United States